Herbert Kesel (3 November 1931 – 15 December 2011) was a German rower. He competed in the men's coxless pair event at the 1952 Summer Olympics, representing Saar.

References

1931 births
2011 deaths
German male rowers
Olympic rowers of Saar
Rowers at the 1952 Summer Olympics
Sportspeople from Mannheim